The Monarch was an automobile built in Detroit, Michigan by the Monarch Motor Car Company from 1913 to 1916.

History
Joseph Bloom founded the company in the spring of 1913 and by August, the company moved into the former Carhartt Motor Car Company factory.  The Monarch was designed by Bloom's brother-in-law Robert C. Hupp, formerly with Hupmobile.

The 4-cylinder 16-hp car sold as a runabout or touring car with a Renault style hood were priced at $1,050, .  Production commenced later that year and 150 had been produced by spring of 1914.  In 1914, a smaller 4-cylinder car was added, selling for $675.  The Monarch was called "The Car with the Silver Wheels" in company advertisements.

Hupp designed a larger vehicle with a 4.6L V8 engine. It was equipped with a Continental Six engine. The new V8 Monarch entered production in 1915, but production could not be sustained, as new investment never materialized.

Monarch Motors was declared bankrupt in the spring of 1916.  Assets were declared to be $20,833 and liabilities $5,753 but they had no cash to operate.  By November, rights to the Monarch had been purchased by the Carter Brothers of Hyattsville, Maryland. The V8 as well as a 12-cylinder model already developed in prototype form by Hupp would be continued, but when the cars went on sale in 1917, they were called C.B.s by the new owners.

References

Defunct motor vehicle manufacturers of the United States
Motor vehicle manufacturers based in Michigan
Rear-wheel-drive vehicles
Hupmobile
Defunct manufacturing companies based in Michigan
Brass Era vehicles
1910s cars
Vehicle manufacturing companies established in 1913
Vehicle manufacturing companies disestablished in 1916
Cars introduced in 1913